Ferdinand Joseph Georges Alexandre Clauzade (2 September 1914 – 10 July 2002) was a French botanist and lichenologist. His specialty was the lichen flora of France and the Mediterranean region.

Biography

Georges Clauzade was born in Marseille, France, on 2 September 1914. He obtained a bachelor's degree in natural sciences  and a master's degree in geology. After passing the final teacher's examination, he was admitted in 1937 to the faculty of natural sciences.

He became a professor of natural sciences at the Lycée d'Amiens from 1936 to 1939, then in Marseille until 1947. From 1947 to 1966, he taught at the Lycée d'Apt. In parallel he studied botany, in particular the phytosociology of lichens with Maurice Bouly de Lesdain.

Recognized for his expertise, he obtained a four-year secondment at the French National Centre for Scientific Research to work full-time in lichenology. He worked with Yves Rondon, at the faculty of pharmacy in Marseille. During these four years, he studied lichen groups in Provence and wrote in collaboration with Paul Ozenda, Les Lichens, an illustrated flora of French lichens, which was published in 1970. This book became quite popular with European lichenologists and became known as "The Clauzenda". He ended his career as an associate at the normal school in Avignon, from 1970 to 1975.

Starting in 1970, he trained many Mediterranean botanists in lichenology, including Juliette Asta, and Xavier Llimona. Although he retired from teaching in 1975, he continued scientific pursuits.

Aware of linguistic problems, he advocated the use of Esperanto, which he practiced both written and spoken. He was the first lichenologist to use the international language in his publications. In 2002, he participated in the revision of the Plena ilustrita vortaro de Esperanto ("Complete Illustrated Dictionary of Esperanto").

In 1985, he published with Claude Roux the work Likenoj de okcidenta Eǔropo: ilustrita determinlibro (Lichens of Western Europe: an illustrated book of determination) then in 1989 Nelikeniĝintaj fungoj likenloĝaj: ilustrita determinlibro (Non-lichenized lichenicultural mushrooms) with Roux and Paul Diederich.

Recognition

A Festschrift was dedicated to Clauzade in 1994 on the occasion of his 80th birthday, titled "Hommage scientifique à G. Clauzade. 80e anniversaire".

In 2000, he received the Acharius Medal from the International Association for Lichenology, an award given for lifetime achievements in lichenology. Georges Clauzade wrote 53 articles and four books, largely about lichen flora in southwestern Europe.

Eponyms

Five genera and several species have been named to honour Clauzade. These include:

Claurouxia ; Clauzadea  Clauzadeana ; Clauzadella ; Clauzadeomyces ; Arthonia clauzadei ; Bacidia clauzadei ; Baeomyces clauzadei ; Biatorella clauzadeana ; Byssoloma clauzadei ; Caloplaca clauzadei ; Lecania clauzadei ; Lecanora clauzadei ; Lichenochora clauzadei ; Polycoccum clauzadei ; Rhizocarpon clauzadei ; Rinodina clauzadei ; Stigmidium clauzadei ; Verrucaria clauzadei ; and Verrucula clauzadaria .

Selected publications

See also
 :Category:Taxa named by Georges Clauzade

References

1914 births
2002 deaths
Acharius Medal recipients
French botanists
20th-century French scientists
French lichenologists
Aix-Marseille University alumni